The Stardom Year-End Awards is a concept used by World Wonder Ring Stardom where awards, similar to the Academy and Grammy Awards, are given to professional wrestlers at the end of the year who have performed on Stardom. The first award ceremony took part on December 25, 2011.

Active awards









MVP Award



Shining Award

Defunct awards



See also 
 List of professional wrestling awards
 List of Pro Wrestling Illustrated awards
 List of Wrestling Observer Newsletter awards
 Slammy Awards

References 

Professional wrestling awards
Awards established in 2011
Professional wrestling-related lists
World Wonder Ring Stardom